Constance M. Carroll is an education leader and advisor in the USA. She has been the head of the San Diego Community College District since 2004.

Education 
Carroll was educated at Duquesne University, where she took a BA degree in Humanities in 1966 before spending a year at Knubly University School of Greek Civilization in Athens. In 1969 she took a Master's degree in Classics at the University of Pittsburgh. She later graduated from Pittsburgh with a PhD in Classics, having written a thesis on ancient Greek tragedy.

Career 
Between 1968 and 1972, Carroll held teaching and administrative posts at the University of Pittsburgh, before moving to the University of Maine, where she worked as assistant dean, and later associate dean of the College of Arts and Sciences as well as assistant professor in Classics. At the age of 31, she became the youngest Black woman college president in the US, when she took up her role as president of Indian Valley Colleges while still studying for her PhD. She also spent time as president of Saddleback College in Orange County, and a year as interim chancellor of the Marin Community College District. She spent 11 years as president of San Diego Mesa College from 1993-2004.

Carroll was appointed by President Obama to the National Council on the Humanities for six years in 2011, and served on numerous local, state, and national boards and committees committed to the San Diego region, educational access, and economic excellence. Prior to arriving in San Diego, she was president of Saddleback College in Orange County and president of Indian Valley Colleges in Marin County, where she also spent one year as interim chancellor of the Marin Community College District.

Among a whole range of awards, in November 2019, Carroll won the Lifetime Leadership Award from the Central San Diego Black Chamber of Commerce for her dedication to the San Diego community and increasing educational access in the San Diego region.

In May 2020 Carroll was appointed to the National Advisory Board of College Promise, which enables deserving students to attend college without payment of tuition; she had previously led the implementation of the Promise program in San Diego.

In 2020, she announced that she intended to retire in 2021.

Distinctions and awards 
 1996: Harry Buttimer Award, the top honour for a California Community College chief executive officer
 2004: Visionary Award for Economic Opportunity from LEAD San Diego
 2007: national Marie Y. Martin CEO Award, Association of Community College Trustees (ACCT)
 2009: Whitney M. Young, Jr., Leadership Award, Urban League of San Diego County
 2013: Leadership in Action Award, Mental Health America of San Diego County
 2013: Trailblazer Award, San Diego Women's Hall of Fame
 2014: Darlene Marcos Shiley Education Leadership Award, San Diego Business Journal's 21st Annual Women Who Mean Business Awards
 2014: Tireless Advocate for Public Education Award, Interfaith Committee for Worker Justice 'Voices for Justice" Breakfast
 2015: Dr. Martin Luther King, Jr., Human Dignity Award, YMCA of San Diego County
 2016: Moving San Diego Forward award, San Diego Regional Chamber of Commerce
 2017: Pioneer Award, national Community College Baccalaureate Association, for her leadership and work in improving access to baccalaureate level education through community colleges
 2019: Woman of the Year in Senate District 39, awarded by Senate President Toni Atkins
 2019: Lifetime Leadership Award, Central San Diego Black Chamber of Commerce
 2019: Lifetime Achievement Award, National Association for Community College Entrepreneurship (NACCE)
 2022: Clark Kerr Award for distinguished leadership in higher education from the UC Berkeley Academic Senate

References 

Living people
San Diego Mesa College faculty
Saddleback College people
Women heads of universities and colleges
American academic administrators
Year of birth missing (living people)
Place of birth missing (living people)
Heads of universities and colleges in the United States
African-American women academics
American women academics
African-American academics
21st-century African-American people
21st-century African-American women